Club Atlético Unión may refer to:
Unión de Mar del Plata
Unión de Santa Fe
Unión de Sunchales